Kailash Choudhary (born 20 September 1973) is an Indian politician who is the current Minister of State for Agriculture and Farmers' Welfare in Second Modi ministry. He is also a Member of Parliament from Barmer, Rajasthan.

Early life and education 
He was educated at the Nagpur University.

Career
He was a former member of the Rajasthan Legislative Assembly representing the Baytu Vidhan Sabha constituency of Rajasthan. He is a Bharatiya Janata Party member.
On 31 May 2019, Choudhary became Minister of State for Agriculture and Farmers Welfare. On, 9 August 2020, he gave the news of being COVID-19 positive through Twitter.

References 

1973 births
Living people
India MPs 2019–present
Lok Sabha members from Rajasthan
Bharatiya Janata Party politicians from Rajasthan
People from Barmer, Rajasthan
Narendra Modi ministry
Rajasthan MLAs 2013–2018